Évanturel Lake (French: Lac Évanturel) is a freshwater body located in the unorganized territory of Lac-Pikauba, in the Charlevoix Regional County Municipality, in the administrative region of Capitale-Nationale, in the province of Quebec, in Canada. This body of water is located in the zec des Martres, outside the Laurentides Wildlife Reserve.

Lake Évanturel is one of the main bodies of water at the head of the Barley River. This mountain lake is entirely located in an area where forestry has always been the predominant economic activity. In the middle of XIXth, recreational tourism activities took off. Due to the altitude, this lake is normally frozen from late October to early May; however, the safe ice circulation period is usually from early December to April.

A forest road serves the western part of the hydrographic slope of Lake Évanturel and another road the eastern part.

Geography 
Located in a forest area in the unorganized territory of Lac-Pikauba in the zec des Martres, Lake Évanturel is located on the northern slope of the Barley River valley. The mouth of Lake Évanturel is located at the bottom of a bay on the south shore of the lake, at:
  north of the forest road R0305;
  south-west of a bay in lac des Martres;
  west of La Malbaie town center;
  north-west of Baie-Saint-Paul town center.

Toponymy 
This name appears on the 1954 map of the Parc des Laurentides and on Regional Map No 3, sheet 3 East, 3 miles per inch, 1957. This name also appeared on the draft map of Lac des Martres, 1961-09-25, item 62.

The term "Évanturel" is a family name of French origin. It is not unreasonable to believe that this toponym evokes the work of life of the Quebec poet Eudore Évanturel (Quebec, September 22, 1852 - Boston, May 16, 1919). Encouraged by the novelist Joseph Marmette, his friend, he published in 1878 a volume of First Poems. This collection, inspired by Musset but with Verlainian accents, scandalized the conservative literary milieu of Quebec at the time. The ruthless and unfair criticisms of Jules-Paul Tardivel in particular dissuaded him from going further in the career. The author subsequently published only a few isolated poems. His work is still little known, but it is nonetheless among the most sensitive, original and inspired poets of Quebec before Nelligan. He is buried in the Notre-Dame-de-Belmont cemetery in Sainte-Foy. This toponymic designation was approved on 1963-07-03 by the Commission de géographie du Québec. Formerly, this body of water was designated "Lac de l'Équerre".

The toponym "Lac Évanturel" was formalized on December 5, 1968 at the Place Names Bank of the Commission de toponymie du Québec.

Related articles 

 Charlevoix Regional County Municipality
 Lac-Pikauba, an unorganized territory
 Zec des Martres
 Malbaie River

References 

Lakes of Capitale-Nationale
Charlevoix Regional County Municipality